Ajay Mishra is an Indian television actor.
He is best known for his roles of Sanjaya in  Mahabharat and Suryaputra Karn and  Nanda  in Baal Krishna.

Early life and education
Ajay Mishra was born in Gola Gokarnnath, Lakhimpur Kheri. He has done his graduation from Lucknow University.

Career
After the doing 6 years Theatre, He joined Bhartendu Natya Academy located in Lucknow. After finishing the acting course, he moved to Mumbai.

Television

Filmography

References

Indian male television actors
21st-century Indian male actors
Indian television presenters
Male actors from Uttar Pradesh
Living people
1986 births